Ruben Mendoza is a strength and conditioning coach and a former guard in the National Football League.

Biography
Mendoza was born Ruben Edward Mendoza on May 10, 1963 in Crystal City, Texas. He is married with five children.

Playing career
Mendoza played at the collegiate level at Wayne State College and the now-defunct Yankton College. He played with the Green Bay Packers during the 1986 NFL season.

Coaching career
Mendoza's first coaching experience was as a graduate assistant at the University of South Carolina. Following his time there he spent a season at Presbyterian College, where he was an assistant strength coach and also coached the defensive line on the school's football team. Four years as the Coordinator of Strength and Conditioning at the University of Tennessee Chattanooga before moving to Clemson University to serve as Assistant Director of Strength and Conditioning. Mendoza later spent four years as Director of Strength and Conditioning at the University of Mississippi before being named Strength and Conditioning Coordinator at the University of Notre Dame. He is now the head strength and conditioning coach at Wayne State University in Detroit.

See also
List of Green Bay Packers players

References

External links
 CSCC Association
 Pro-Football-Reference.Com

1963 births
Living people
American football offensive guards
American strength and conditioning coaches
Presbyterian Blue Hose football coaches
Green Bay Packers players
Wayne State Wildcats football players
Yankton Greyhounds football players
People from Crystal City, Texas
Players of American football from Texas